Lamu Wind Power Station, also Lamu Wind Farm, is a planned  wind-powered power station in Kenya.

Location

The project is expected to displace over 600 families, who will be compensated to relocate.

Overview
As part of efforts to diversify the energy sources in Kenya, Kenwinds Holdings, a private company, plans to establish a 90 MW wind farm in Mpeketoni Division at the Kenyan coast in Lamu County. The power generated will be evacuated via a new , 220 kV power line from Lamu  to Rabai, where it will be integrated into the national grid.

Development partners
The power station will be owned and operated by Kenwind Holdings Limited, a Kenyan corporation. Kenwind Holdings is a subsidiary of Electrawinds, a Belgian energy company, which is collaborating on the project. The International Finance Corporation, a branch of the World Bank is providing a portion of the budgeted US$$235 million financing.

Land dispute
In March 2017, Cordisons International Limited, an American wind-energy developer, went to court to challenge Kenwind Holdings Limited's right to the  piece of property on which the development will sit. In May 2018, Kenwind Holdings Limited, the Belgian company, prevailed in court and retained the rights to develop this power station.

Recent developments
In February 2020, the developers of this power station signed a 20-year power purchase agreement with Kenya Power and Lighting Company, the country's electricity transmission and distribution monopoly. The electricity is expected to cost US$0.07 per kilowatt-hour (kWh).

See also

 List of power stations in Kenya
 Wind power in Kenya

References

External links
 KenGen
 Ministry of Energy and Petroleum (Kenya)
 Energy Regulation Commission (Kenya)
 Kenya Power

Wind farms in Kenya
Lamu County
Buildings and structures in Lamu County
Proposed wind farms
Proposed renewable energy power stations in Kenya